The Golden Reel Award for Outstanding Achievement in Sound Editing – Dialogue and ADR for Feature Film is an annual award given by the Motion Picture Sound Editors. It honors sound editors whose work has warranted merit in the field of cinema; in this case, their work in the field of automated dialogue replacement, or ADR. It was first awarded in 1964, for films released the previous year, under the title Best Sound Editing – Loop Lines. The following year, the award was re-titled Best Sound Editing – Dialogue, and would remain this until 1984, before being changed to Best Sound Editing – ADR. In 1991, the "dialogue" and "ADR" aspects of the process were divided into separate categories and would, intermittently, be awarded for the next seven years, before combining again in 1998, under the title Best Sound Editing – Dialogue & ADR. The award has been given with its current title since 2018.

Winners and nominees

1960s
Best Sound Editing – Loop Lines

Best Sound Editing – Dialogue

1970s

1980s

Best Sound Editing – ADR

1990s

Best Sound Editing – Dialogue

Best Sound Editing – Dialogue & ADR, Domestic Feature Film

Best Sound Editing – Dialogue

Best Sound Editing – Dialogue & ADR

2000s
Best Sound Editing – Dialogue & ADR, Domestic Feature Film

Best Sound Editing in Feature Film – Dialogue & ADR

2010s

Outstanding Achievement in Sound Editing – Dialogue and ADR for Feature Film

2020s

External links
Official MPSE Website

References

Golden Reel Awards (Motion Picture Sound Editors)